Lubbertus Götzen (10 October 1894, Amsterdam – 13 July 1979, The Hague) was a Dutch accountant and politician.

He embarked upon a civil service career in the Dutch East Indies. He was a minister of the Department of Finance. In Indonesia he was politically active in the Christian political party.

1894 births
1979 deaths
Anti-Revolutionary Party politicians
Dutch accountants
Dutch civil servants
Grand Officers of the Order of Orange-Nassau
Independent politicians in the Netherlands
Members of the Court of Audit (Netherlands)
Ministers of Colonial Affairs of the Netherlands
Ministers without portfolio of the Netherlands
Politicians from Amsterdam
Reformed Churches Christians from the Netherlands
World War II civilian prisoners held by Japan